Paratoxopoda is a genus of flies in the family Sepsidae.

Species
Paratoxopoda abyssinica Ozerov, 2004
Paratoxopoda akuminambili Vanschuytbroeck, 1961
Paratoxopoda akuminamoya Vanschuytbroeck, 1961
Paratoxopoda amonane Vanschuytbroeck, 1961
Paratoxopoda angolica Ozerov, 1993
Paratoxopoda asaba Vanschuytbroeck, 1961
Paratoxopoda asita Vanschuytbroeck, 1961
Paratoxopoda barbata Ozerov, 1993
Paratoxopoda crassiforceps Duda, 1926
Paratoxopoda depilis (Walker, 1849)
Paratoxopoda frontalis Ozerov, 1993
Paratoxopoda glabra Ozerov, 1993
Paratoxopoda intermedia Duda, 1926
Paratoxopoda kilinderensis (Vanschuytbroeck, 1963)
Paratoxopoda magna Ozerov, 1993
Paratoxopoda mystacea Ozerov, 2018
Paratoxopoda nigritarsis Duda, 1926
Paratoxopoda pelengensis Vanschuytbroeck, 1963
Paratoxopoda pilifemorata Soós, 1964
Paratoxopoda rufithorax Ozerov, 1993
Paratoxopoda rufiventris Ozerov, 1996
Paratoxopoda saegeri (Vanschuytbroeck, 1961)
Paratoxopoda similis Ozerov, 1993
Paratoxopoda straeleni Vanschuytbroeck, 1961
Paratoxopoda tenebrica Ozerov, 1993
Paratoxopoda tricolor (Walker, 1849)
Paratoxopoda varicoxa Curran, 1929
Paratoxopoda villicoxa Duda, 1926
Paratoxopoda zuskai Ozerov, 1993

References

Sepsidae
Diptera of Africa
Taxa named by Oswald Duda
Brachycera genera